Iain Baird (born  January 1, 1963) is a Canadian former soccer defender who earned nine caps with the Canadian national soccer team between 1984 and 1986.

Baird played for the Victoria Riptides during the 1985 Western Soccer Alliance Challenge Cup.  He played for the Ottawa Pioneers in the Canadian Soccer League in 1987 and again for the renamed Ottawa Intrepid in 1988.

From 1995 to December 2001, Baird was the head coach of the men's soccer team at Malaspina University College in Nanaimo.  In 1998, he led the team to a second place at the Canadian Colleges Athletic Association championships.  That year the CCAA awarded Coach Baird its Coaching Excellence Award.  During his years as a coach, he also taught physical education and Japanese at John Barsby Secondary School. He teaches physical education and coaches the junior and senior soccer teams at Dover Bay Secondary School in Nanaimo.

References

Living people
1971 births
Soccer people from British Columbia
Canada men's international soccer players
Canadian soccer coaches
Canadian Soccer League (1987–1992) players
Canadian soccer players
Association football defenders
Ottawa Intrepid players
Sportspeople from Nanaimo
Canadian people of Scottish descent
Victoria Riptides players
Western Soccer Alliance players
Victoria Vistas players